Duw may be:

DUW, the name of a series of watches by German company Nomos Glashütte
duw, the ISO 639-3 code of the Dusun Witu language of Indonesia
DÜW, the station code for train station Landkreis Bad Dürkheim, Bad Dürkheim, Rhineland-Palatinate, Germany; see List of railway stations in Rhineland-Palatinate

See also 

 Dół ( pronounced as: [ˈduw] ), Gmina Iława, Iława, Warmian-Masurian, Poland
 
 Douw (disambiguation)
 Dow (disambiguation)